The Danilovsky Maniac (also known as The Maniac with Dull Eyes), is an unidentified Russian serial killer. It is suspected that he committed at least 7 murders between 2004 and 2007 in the city of Cherepovets, in the Vologda Oblast. Three of the murders were committed on an abandoned construction site on Danilovsky Street, from which the killer earned his nickname.

Murders 
In 2008, the criminal case totaled 18 volumes, and about 200 people were interviewed. The Cherepovets Mayor's Office announced a reward for anybody who helped to catch the maniac - 500 thousand rubles.

Chronology 
 On February 4, 2004, 17-year-old Marina Ostrovskaya went missing.
 In August 2004, a 19-year-old pupil of the metallurgical college, Irina Popova, was raped and stifled in the Pitinsky wasteland.
 On September 5, 2004, 22-year-old Tatyana Baeva was raped and strangled at the local art school.
 On December 8, 2004, 17-year-old Tatyana Maksimova was raped and strangled on Milyutina Street.
 On June 26, 2005, 31-year-old Lyudmila Miroshnichenko failed to arrive at work.
 On July 14, 2005,  the maniac killed 19-year-old Svetlana Stepanova. When the investigators arrived at the crime scene, two more rotting corpses were found nearby - those of Miroshnichenko and Ostrovskaya.
 On June 11, 2007, 17-year-old Natalya Zakalova was killed.
 Probably involved in the murder of a woman named Elena, which occurred in 2010 in Vologda.
 Possibly involved in a series of murders of young girls that occurred between 1999 and 2003.

On the walls near the site of the murders, drawings of a pornographic nature were found.

See also
 List of fugitives from justice who disappeared
 List of Russian serial killers

References

External links 
 Million for the maniac - relevant again

Male serial killers
Russian rapists
Russian serial killers
Unidentified rapists
Unidentified serial killers
Unsolved murders in Russia